Gry Tofte Ims (born 2 March 1986) is a former Norwegian footballer. She has played for Klepp IL since 2003 and was named captain of the team at the end of 2008 after the retirement of Ane Stangeland Horpestad. By 2012 she was placed fourth in the club's all-time appearance list.

Ims made her senior national team debut in January 2010, in a 1–0 friendly defeat by China at La Manga Stadium. She was called up to be part of the national team for the 2011 FIFA Women's World Cup and UEFA Women's Euro 2013.

References

External links
 
 
 Norwegian national team profile 
 
 
 

1986 births
Living people
Norwegian women's footballers
Norway women's international footballers
Toppserien players
Klepp IL players
Sportspeople from Stavanger
2015 FIFA Women's World Cup players
Women's association football midfielders
2011 FIFA Women's World Cup players